The International Space Orchestra (ISO) is a team of space scientists from the NASA Ames Research Center,  SETI Institute (Search for Extraterrestrial Intelligence), Singularity University, and the International Space University.

The International Space Orchestra was created, assembled and is currently directed by designer of experiences and director Nelly Ben Hayoun. The musical director of ISO is the two-time Grammy award winner, violinist and composer, Evan Price. The International Space Orchestra collaborated with Kid Cudi, The Avalanches, Sigur Rós, Savages, The Prodigy, Beck, Bobby Womack, Damon Albarn, Maywa Denki, Bruce Sterling and Penguin Café in a musical collaboration that took music into space.

Members of the International Space Orchestra include /Lunar Atmosphere and Dust Environment Explorer NASA Flight Director Rusty Hunt, NASA Ames Research Center Deputy Director Lewis S. G. Braxton III and NASA astronaut Yvonne Cagle.

Public space outreach 

In the summer of 2012 in California, ISO performed Ground Control: An Opera in Space, a 27-minute-long performance part scripted and based on the reenactment of the Apollo 11's mission control and part musical. Ground Control: An Opera in Space was composed by a team including Damon Albarn of Blur and Gorillaz, Bobby Womack, Richard Russell, Mike Smith (Music Director of Gorillaz), Arthur Jeffes of Penguin Café, Maywa Denki (inventor of Otamatone), and  Evan Price, with a libretto by science-fiction author Bruce Sterling and Jasmina Tesanovic.

ISO's first performance took place in front of the 80 by 120 foot wind tunnel (world's largest) located at NASA Ames Research Center and its second in San Jose, California during the ZERO1 Biennial (North America's most significant showcase of work at the nexus of art and technology).

In addition, public talks by leading NASA and SETI Institute (Search for Extraterrestrial Life) scientists were curated by Nelly Ben Hayoun, giving insights into missions that inspired the musical composition. These included presentations by SETI Institute (Search for Extraterrestrial Life) Director of Research Gerry Harp, NASA Ames Research Center Chief Scientist Jacob Cohen, Kepler Mission Manager Roger Hunter and Lunar Crater Observation and Sensing Satellite/ LADEE NASA Flight Director Rusty Hunt.

In January 2013, the International Space Orchestra feature film had its world premiere at the Rotterdam International Film Festival where it was acclaimed by the critic as a "masterpiece" (Independent Cinema Office, ICO), a "real achievement" (DOMUS), "as thrilling as watching a rocket launch" and "Spine Tingling" (The Guardian).  This feature film was later screened at the INDABA Film Festival, the Z33 House Of Contemporary Art, V&A Museum and SXSW Interactive Festival in Austin, Texas.

In May 2013, the International Space Orchestra performed at the Davies Symphony Hall, San Francisco in front of 2,700 people with singer Beck.  In September 2013, the International Space Orchestra featured at the Beijing Design Week, China.

On April 19, 2016, the International Space Orchestra performed at the historic Fillmore Auditorium, San Francisco with the all-female British rock group the Savages.

On September 24, 2016, the International Space Orchestra opened for the Icelandic group Sigur Ros, playing the Sigur Ros songs Vidrar, Olsen Olsen, Hoppipola and Hafsol (orchestrated and conducted by Gordon Lustig)  to a sold-out audience of 17,500 at the Hollywood Bowl.  After their set, members of ISO also performed outreach as "Space Vikings" to members of the audience, educating the audience on space research related topics.

In November 2016, the International Space Orchestra recorded tracks at 25th Street Recording in Oakland, California to celebrate their recent collaborations with rock band Savages and Icelandic group Sigur Rós.

As well as being an unconventional public space outreach event, ISO also acts as an experiential and hybrid interdisciplinary research environment in which space scientists and engineers were invited to implement, deconstruct, perform, sing, mix, modify, and design musical acts in control rooms, acting as a provocation to imagine and disrupt human relationships with science and technology.

Satellite carrying recordings in orbit 

Ground Control: An Opera in Space was recorded at Skywalker Ranch, George Lucas' studio, where Star Wars was developed.

On 4 August 2013, two ArduSat (Arduino based Nanosatellite run by the company Nanosatisfi) carrying the ISO recordings were launched aboard the H-IIB Launch Vehicle, HTV-4 from Yoshinobu Launch Complex at the Tanegashima Space Centre. A video of the launch is available for public access online.

On 19 November 2013, these ArduSat got released from the International Space Station by the six-member Expedition 38 crew. The orbiting residents worked with mission controllers around the world on deploying the ArduSat from Kibo’s airlock Tuesday 19 at 7:10 a.m. EST.

In May 2015, Italian European Space Agency astronaut Samantha Cristoforetti delivered the ISO recordings to the ISS during her space expedition record for longest single space flight by a woman (199 days 16 hours) and for the longest uninterrupted spaceflight of a European astronaut.

Members of the International Space Orchestra 

 Jacob Cohen, Chief scientist, NASA Ames Research Center- Gong
 Rusty Hunt, NASA Flight Director LCROSS Lunar Impactor, NASA Ames Research Center- Saxophone
 Barbara Jo Navarro, Asst. Chief, Flight Systems Implementation Branch at NASA Ames Research Center- Trumpet
 Yvonne Cagle, NASA Astronaut, NASA Ames Research Center- Bass Drum and triangle
 Gregory D Paulson, ARC-P, Universities Space Research Association-Trombone
 Mary Paulson, Gregory N. Paulson’s mother-Flute and Piccolo
 Ralph Bach, Analyst at NASA Ames Research Center, Aviation and Aerospace- Trumpet
 Frank Caradonna, Aeronautical engineer, NASA Ames Research Center, NASA Ames Jazz Band- Piano
 Robert ‘Bob’ Crow, Retired, NASA Ames Jazz Band- Saxophone
 Matthew J Daigle, Research Computer Scientist Intelligent Systems Division NASA Ames Research Center- Guitar
 Paul K Davis, Instrument Development Technical Group, NASA Ames Research Center- Viola and violin
 Johnathan.W.Conley, NASA Ames research Center-Percussion
 Larry Farnsley, Electrical Engineer, NASA Ames Jazz Band- String and electric bass
 Theodore Garbeff, Research engineer at the experimental fluid physics branch, NASA Ames Research Center- Violin
 Elisabeth B Gee Giessler, Dr. of Optometry- Violin
 Michael A. K. Gross, Software and systems engineer for SOFIA, NASA Ames- Trombone
 Lukas Gruendler, Research Assistant at SETI Institute- Trombone
 Vanessa Kuroda, Code RE Electronics Engineer, LADEE Communications, NASA Ames- Piano
 Matthew Linton, IT Security Specialist at NASA Ames Research Center- Cello
 Gregory Lindsay, NASA Ames Jazz Band- Drums
 Rodney Martin, Intelligent Systems Division, NASA Ames Research Center - Percussion and Clarinet
 Veronica Phillips, Technical writer, Stinger Gaffarian Technologies, Inc-Clarinet
 Annette Rodrigues, Former associate director for Center Operations at NASA Ames Research Center, NASA Ames Bluegrass Band- Ukulele
 David P Roland, Optics Engineer, Telescope Technologist-Dobro and ukulele
 Peter I Robinson, Computer Scientist at NASA Ames Research Center- Bassoon
 Gregory K Schmidt, Solar System Exploration Research Virtual Institute Deputy Director, NASA Ames Research Center; NASA Ames Bluegrass Band - Ukulele
 Arthur Schwartz, Retired, founder and ex-officio member of the Air and Space Education Foundation- French Horn
 Michael A Wilson, NASA Ames Astrobiology Institute- Saxophone
 Janice Bishop, Senior Research Scientist, SETI Institute- clarinet
 Scott Poll, Intelligent Systems Division. NASA Ames Research Center- violin
 Shea Comfort, worked for NASA on developing guidance systems for Mercury, Gemini & Apollo.- Duduk Player
 Oliwia Baney, former Earth Science Researcher at NASA Ames - Cello

Choir members 
 Aileen Aniciete, Administrative Assistant Intern, NASA Ames Research Center
 Leighton Anunciacion, Technology Partnerships Division, Deltha-Critique. NASA Ames Research Center
 Karen Bradford, Chief of Staff, NASA Ames Research Center
 John L. Bresina, LCROSS/LADDEE Activity Planning & Command Sequencing Lead, NASA Ames Research Center
 Craig D Burkhard, Micro 6 Project Advisor, NASA Ames Research Center
 John Cumbers, Synthetic Biology Program, NASA Ames Research Center
 Zhenzhen Cumbers, John Cumbers’ daughter
 Emeline Paat-Dahlstrom, VP, Operations, Singularity University
 Aleta Hayes, Lecturer, Stanford, and NASA Ames collaborator
 Michaela Herman, Web developer, NASA Ames Research Center
 Sarah Hobart, LADEE, Software and Space Systems manager NASA Ames Research Center
 Geoffrey Lee, Project Manager, NASA Research Park
 Derek Love, Office of Diversity and Equal Opportunity, NASA Ames Research Center
 Laura Shawnee, Education Specialist at NASA Ames Research Center
 Marianne Ryan, Director of Leadership & Engagement at Singularity University
 Jasmina Tesanovic, ISO Librettist
 Ellen Schwartz, Arthur Schwartz’s daughter
 Jonathan Knowles, Design Chair, Singularity University
 Jamie Drew, Science Manager, NASA Ames Research Center

References

External links
 A.I.L 11: Nelly Ben Hayoun talking about the International Space Orchestra with Regine DebattyInternational Space Orchestra, Nelly Ben Hayoun answers Regine Debatty's questions on Resonance FM
 BBC Radio 4 Interview with ISO Director Nelly Ben Hayoun on September 5, 2013, 11:30am

NASA people
Musical groups from the San Francisco Bay Area
Orchestras based in California